Man in the Moon is a 1960 comedy film directed by Basil Dearden. The film stars Kenneth More and Shirley Anne Field.

Plot
William Blood (More) is a man who appears to be immune to all known diseases, and possesses extraordinary resistance to heat and cold – a fact he puts down to his carefree, single life, never committing to any woman, and never being worried by anything. He makes a living working for medical researchers who are trying to find cures for various diseases and conditions (notably the common cold and seasickness).

Blood is offered a job by Dr Davidson (Hordern) to become the passenger of a high altitude test flight, but the real job is to become the first man to land on the Moon. The truth is kept from him because of the extreme danger involved, and because he is regarded as expendable. He undertakes training with three other potential astronauts, including Leo (Gray), all expensively trained and more qualified for the job but without Blood's extraordinary resistances. Blood never really fits in with the others and, when a £100,000 reward is posted for the first man to land on the Moon, they seek to sabotage his chances and have one of their number selected instead.

When Blood meets and falls in love with an attractive stripper named Polly (Field), he begins to lose his immunity. Spurred by the news of the reward, he decides to continue his training so that he and Polly will be able to afford a new home when he returns. Leo becomes insanely jealous and tries to sabotage Blood's training, but he manages to survive the attempt. When the scientists realise that Leo is the saboteur they use a session in a sensory deprivation chamber to brainwash him into believing he is Blood's best friend. Later, when Polly falls into a river and is in danger of drowning, Leo saves her but allows Blood to take the credit.

Once their training is complete, the astronauts are flown to the Woomera rocket base and Blood takes part in what appears to be a completely successful launch. Three days later he steps out of his capsule onto what appears to be the moon's surface. While exploring he is startled by what appears to be an extraterrestrial being, and then spots a used baked beans can. His capsule had ejected from the rocket prematurely, landing him in the Australian outback only a few miles from Woomera, and the "alien" turns out to be a man prospecting for uranium.

Making his way back to the base, Blood tells the scientists "back to the drawing board". Back in England, he and Polly take part in a test for family planning; the three cots by their bed indicate that the test has been successful.

Cast
 Kenneth More as William Blood
 Shirley Anne Field as Polly
 Norman Bird as Herbert 
 Michael Hordern as Dr. Davidson
 John Glyn-Jones as Dr. Wilmot
 John Phillips as Professor Stephens 
 Charles Gray as Leo 
 Bernard Horsfall as Rex
 Bruce Boa as Roy
 Noel Purcell as Prospector 
 Ed Devereaux as Storekeeper 
 Newton Blick as Dr. Hollis

Production
In order to make Man in the Moon appear authentic, the production company spent months "in scientific research" so that "those scenes in which the space men are trained for their trip to the moon" were credible. "With the consent of the British Air Ministry, certain top-secret information – including experiments in rocket propulsion, conditions under tests, and the reactions of bodies to extreme pressure – was made available. More data came from America and, strangely, even more from Russian sources".

Reception
Man in the Moon had a Royal Charity Premiere attended by Queen Elizabeth II and Prince Philip, Duke of Edinburgh on 31 October 1960 at the Odeon Leicester Square and entered general release on the Rank circuit (Odeons and Gaumonts) from mid-January 1961. 

Variety called it "amiably amusing".

On its United States release, film reviewer Bosley Crowther described the plot as following a course of "appropriately wacky illogic". He further considered More the key to the "utterly slapdash film, which qualifies for attention because of its cheerfulness and Mr. More".

Unexpectedly, considering the talents involved, Man in the Moon performed disappointingly at the box office. It has been called "More's first real flop" since he became a movie star. By 1971, the film was still £37,000 short of breaking even.

DVD release
Man in the Moon is available on Region 2 DVD.

Novelisation
A novelisation of the Man in the Moon screenplay was written by John Foley and published in the UK by Four Square Books, Ltd. The copyright date of 1960 would indicate that it was published slightly in advance of the film's general release. The book runs 160 pages and contains a four-page insert of black-and-white movie stills.

Notes

References

Bibliography
 Shipman, David. The Great Movie Stars: The International Years. London: Macdonald, 1989. .
 Walker, Alexander. Hollywood, England: The British Film Industry in the Sixties. New York: Stein and Day, 1974. .

External links
 
 

1960 films
Films directed by Basil Dearden
Films shot at Pinewood Studios
British science fiction comedy films
1960s science fiction comedy films
Films about astronauts
1960 comedy films
1960s English-language films
1960s British films